Jennifer Gray may refer to:

 Jennifer Gray (actress), British actress
 Jennifer Gray (cricketer), Irish cricketer

See also
 Jennifer Grey, American actress